Petrophile misturata is a species of flowering plant in the family Proteaceae and is endemic to southwestern Western Australia. It is a shrub with simple and pinnate, needle-shaped leaves and spherical heads of hairy, dull yellow flowers.

Description

Taxonomy
Petrophile misturata was first formally described in 1995 by Donald Bruce Foreman in Flora of Australia from material collected by Kenneth Newbey near Quairading in 1964. The specific epithet (misturata) means "mingled" or "mixed", referring to the varying leaf shapes.

Distribution and habitat
This petrophile grows in sand mostly near Quairading, sometimes near Tammin and between Hines Hill and Bruce Rock, in the Avon Wheatbelt biogeographic region of southwestern Western Australia.

Conservation status
Petrophile misturata is classified as "not threatened" by the Western Australian Government Department of Parks and Wildlife.

References

misturata
Eudicots of Western Australia
Endemic flora of Western Australia
Plants described in 1995